The following is a list of defunct paramilitary organizations.

List of defunct governmental paramilitary units (in alphabetical order)

List of defunct non-governmental paramilitary units (in alphabetical order) 

 Ahlu Sunna Waljama'a in Somalia
 The Blackshirts of the National Fascist Party in Fascist Italy
 The Opera Nazionale Balilla of Fascist Italy
 The Gioventù Italiana del Littorio of Fascist Italy
 The Chetniks, royalist supporters of the Yugoslav government-in-exile in Yugoslavia in World War II
 The Combat Groups of the Working Class of the Socialist Unity Party in East Germany
 Defense of the Revolution of the People's Democratic Party Of Afghanistan
 The Frikorps Danmark of the Nazi Party in Denmark
 The Heimwehr of the Fatherland Front in Austria
 The Hird of the Nasjonal Samling under the Quisling regime in the Reichskommissariat Norwegen
 The Hitler Youth of the Nazi Party in Nazi Germany
 The Hlinkova garda of the People's Party in Slovakia
 The Munkásőrség in communist Hungary
 The Ostmärkische Sturmscharen of the Catholic Youth in fascist Austria
 The Munckska kåren in Sweden
 The New Guard of Australia
 The People's Militias of the Communist Party in the Czechoslovak Socialist Republic
 The Republikanischer Schutzbund of the Social Democratic Party of Austria
 The Rodobrana of the Slovak People's Party of Czechoslovakia
 The Roter Frontkämpferbund of the Communist Party of Germany during the Weimar Republic
 The Reichsbanner Schwarz-Rot-Gold of the Weimar Coalition during the Weimar Republic
 The Eiserne Front of the SPD with the ADGB, the Reichsbanner Schwarz-Rot-Gold and workers' sport clubs during the Weimar Republic.
 Der Stahlhelm of the German National People's Party in the Weimar Republic
 The SA of the Nazi Party in the Weimar Republic and Nazi Germany
 The SS of the Nazi Party in Nazi Germany
 The Self-Defense Forces of Colombia
 Suojeluskunta, volunteer militia in Finland 1918–1944. 
 The Patriotic Guards of the Romanian Communist Party in the Socialist Republic of Romania
 The Tonton Macoute of the National Unity Party in Haiti during the regime of François Duvalier
The Waffen-SS of the Nazi Party in Nazi Germany
Ukrainian Volunteer Corps 
Salwa Judum
Kuer Sena
Ranvir Sena

See also
List of Free Corps
List of paramilitary organizations
Paramilitary

 
defunct
Lists of defunct organizations